Mill Brook Ridge is a mountain located in the Catskill Mountains of New York south of Arkville. Mill Brook Ridge is located north of Woodpecker Ridge.

References

Mountains of Ulster County, New York
Mountains of New York (state)